The Negro Farmer: Extension Work for Better Farming and Better Living is a 1938 educational film made by the United States Department of Agriculture with assistance from the Tuskegee Institute. It features music, entitled "Negro Melodies", from the Tuskegee Institute Choir directed by African American composer William L. Dawson (composer). Through commentary from a white male narrator using racial innuendo inferring African American inferiority in farming practices, the film is a condescending, "paternalistic portrait of black rural life", intended to "halt a mass migration to the urban north by black people".

With a 23 minute runtime, the film features Redoshi (c. 1848 – 1937) (renamed Sally Smith by her enslaver, Washington Smith), a West African woman taken to Dallas County, Alabama in 1860. Redoshi is considered one of the two last surviving victims of the transatlantic slave trade.

The film is held by the Library of Congress. It was part of a U.S. governmental effort to promote agricultural improvements guided by the USDA's guidance, emphasizing that "blacks should stay on Southern farms".

Crew
 Raymond Evans (director) - Director, Producer. Directed Poor Mrs. Jones! (1926) and Hemp for Victory (1943) 
 George G Farrington - Narrator

References

Documentary films about African Americans
1938 short films
American documentary films
1938 films
1930s American films